The Barha dynasty was a Shi'a Indian Muslim dynasty of Sayyid origin, descending from the 7th-century AD caliph Ali. 

The dynasty is well known for the martial prowess of its members who always lead their armies from the vanguard. However, it is best remembered for its member's role as de facto rulers over most of South Asia at the start of the 18th century, as well as their general tolerance to their non-Muslim subjects. The powerful Nawab Hussain Ali Khan and Nawab Abdullah Khan abolished poll tax against non-Muslims throughout India, brought the Marathas into the Mughal fold and helped win over Hindu Rajput rulers like Ajit Singh of Marwar.

Etymology 
The meaning of the name Barha is uncertain. Some contend that it comes from the word bahir, meaning "outsider", in reference to the preference of members of the Barha dynasty to live outside Delhi to avoid scandalised localities such as Mina Bazar which would be unsuited for their sacred natures. Others like the emperor Jahangir believed that it came from the Hindi word barha, meaning "twelve", in reference to the twelve townships that members of the dynasty had received as fiefs from Sultan Shibabdudin of Ghor when they first arrived in India.

Ancestry 
The dynasty descends in the male line from the fourth Rashidun caliph, Ali, through his younger son Husayn. In Arabia, the ancestor's of the dynasty took part in many rebellions against Abbasid authority. One of their ancestors, Isa bin Zayd, revolted against the caliph Al Mahdi and was consequently poisoned by that caliph at the age of 45. Subsequently, the family were heavily persecuted by the Abbasid government, and eventually the founder of the Barha dynasty, Abul Farah Al Wasiti, fled from Madina to Wasit and from there he fled to the Ghaznavid Empire. His four sons entered into the military service of Sultan Mahmud of Ghazni and received twelve fiefs in Punjab, then a part of the Ghaznavid Empire, as reward for their service. Through military service, the dynasty became quickly established as Nobles of the Sword in ancient India, a status they held under several different empires. They held a particularly high status under the Sultanate of Delhi. When the chief of the Barha, who was also the diwan of the empire, was granted the fief of Saharanpur due to his relation with the imperial family. They also enjoyed particularly prominent positions under the reign of the Sur, eventually defecting during the last days in the reign of Sikander Sur of the Sur Empire, to the Emperor Akbar of the Mughal Empire in the course of the siege of Mankot.

The Barha dynasty maintains the unique status of having been the only dynasty to participate in all three Battles of Panipat, seminal battles which shaped Indian history. Under the Lodi in the First Battle of Panipat. In the Second Battle of Panipat they gained victory under Bairam Khan, and finally in the Third Battle Of Panipat, the sons of Nawab Ali Muhammad Khan Rohilla fought with Ahmed Shah Abidali against the Maratha.

By the time of the emperor Aurangzeb, the dynasty was firmly regarded as "Old Nobility" and enjoyed the unique status of holding the premier realms of Ajmer and Dakhin. Realms usually reserved for the rule of members of the imperial family.

Branches 
The children of Abdullah Abul Farah al wasiti settled in various towns, each eventually forming its own branch.
Sayyid Daud settled in Tihaanpur, giving rise to the Tihaanpuri branch. 
Sayyid Abul Fazl settled in Chhatbannur giving rise to the Chhaturai branch. 
Sayyid Najmudin Hussain settled in Jagner, giving rise to the Jagner branch.
Sayyid Fazail settled in Kundli giving rise to the Lundliwal branch.

All the branches eventually migrated to the Doab where the branches occupied the following towns:

Kumhera and Dharsi by Tihaanpur 
Sambalhera by Chatrauris 
Jagneri by Bithauli 
Majhera by Kundliwal

Tihanpur branch 
The Tihanpuri branch has the greatest claim to fame of all the branches of the dynasty. The branch began with Sayyid Jalal Khan Emir, 8th in descent from Abdullah al wasiti. Khan Emir left Tihanpur and settled in Dharsi located in the pargana of Jauli. He had four sons, of who the eldest Umar Shahid settled in Jansath, a second son Chaman settled in Chitaura and a third son Hassan settled in Bihari and a fourth Ahmad made his home in Kawal in the pargana of Jansath.

Jansath 

Umar found Jansath already occupied by Jats and Brahmins however during the branch's ascendancy in the later mughal era, the branch extended itself so much that Jansath became detached from the Jauli pargana.

Its also from this branch that the famous Nawab Abdullah Khan I emerged, better known in places like Ajmer as Sayyid Mian. The branch benefited from Aurangzeb's reign and by the time Aurangzeb passed away, the branch had considerable influence with Sayyid Mian's sons Nawab Hussain Ali Khan and Nawab Abdullah Khan II being attached to the future emperor Bahadur Shah. Nawab Hussain Ali Khan and Nawab Abdullah Khan II also known as the Sayyid Brothers were positioned such that when Bahadur Shah I ascended to the throne with the help of the brothers, he granted the former the government of Patna and the latter the government of Allahbad.

In 1709, Sayyid Ahmad, Sayyid Khan, Sayyid Hussain Khan and Sayyid Ghairat Khan all distinguished themselves in crushing a rebellion of Hindu Princes on the Narbada. During which they fought in the vanguard and all perished to a man with their followers. The Tihaanpuris continued to distinguish themselves in Punjab, Gujrat and along the Indus until they reach supremacy and became masters over South Asia.

In 1712, the sons of Sayyid Mian, having found themselves in a dangerous position and distrustful of other ministers at Delhi, took it upon themselves to raise Prince Furrukhsiyar to the throne as Emperor. During the process the sons of Sayyid Mian distinguished themselves in battle, with Sayyid Nurudin Ali Khan, Najmudin Ali Khan and Saifudin Ali Khan having fought gallantly in the battles of Sarai Alam Chand (Allahbad) and Agra. With Nurudin Ali Khan having lost his life at Allahbad.

Nawab Sayyid Hassan Ali Khan who thereafter became known as Abdullah Khan II, was appointed as Grand Vezier with the title of Qutb al Mulk, while Nawab Sayyid Hussain Ali Khan was appointed as Commander-in-Chief with the title of Amir ul Mammalik. In the demise of the Sayyid Brothers many other Sayyids of note fell with them, first with the assassination of Hussain Ali Khan and later at the Battle of Hasanpur where Abdullah Khan II was captured.  Much of the Tihanpur Branch was destroyed by the efforts of Muhammad Amin Khan and Qamar ud din Khan, with only the Rohilla Dynasty having survived the general destruction of the Tihaanpuris

Chaman 
The branch of Chaman comes next in line to the Jansath branch. Descending from Sayyid Chaman who settled in Chitura, this branch gained much influence during the reign of Shah Jahan when Sayyid Jalal become a high ranking Mansabdar and was given possession of Kharwa Jalalpur in the Sardhan pargana of Meerut. However the branch fell in decline when Sayyid Shams, son of Sayyid Jalal left Imperial service. He had two sons, Sayyid Asghar Ali and Sayyid Asad Ali. The former died childless while the descendants of the latter remained in Chitura until the Biritsh era.

Hassan 
Sayyid Hassan had six sons, many of whom rose in imperial service and later became zamindars.

Ahmad 
The descendants of Sayyid Ahmad who had settled in Kawal gained much acclaim during the reign of Aurangzeb when Tatar Khan and Diwan Muhammad Yar Khan became distinguished in imperial service.

Khan Jahan 

Sayyid Nasirudin, the sixth son of Sayyid Hasan, gained much fame in the form of Sayyid Khanjahan-i-Shahjahanil, who attained much power under the emperor Shahjahan and was consequently granted forty villages in the parganas of Khatauli and Sarwat, along with several bighas of land in free revenue for perpetuity with he title of Abul Muzaffar He began to build a new town which was completed by his son and named Muzaffarnagar.

Chatrauri branch 
They, lived near Sambelhera and changed their name from Chatbanauri to Chatrauri. One of the members of this branch, Sayyid Hasan Fakhrudin, lived during the reign of Emperor Akbar. He used his influence at court to help the Raja of Sambalhera to confirm his dignity in the male line to his son, Ram Chand. Later when Ram Chand died childless, he helped the widow of Ram Chand to inherit the state. Being so pleased with the service rendered to her, she passed on the entirety of her estate to Sayyid Hassan, who was later confirmed in its possession as the Nawab of Sambelhera.

Sayyid Hassan had a child named Sayyid Hussain, who in turn had four children. Sayyid Sher Ali who died without issue, Sayyid Ahmad who was killed fighting Ratan Sen of Chitor and whose descendants settled in Kailawada and another descendant fought under the emperor Muhammad Shah, Sayyid Tajudin whose son Sayyid Umar founded Kakrauli and colonised the local towns of Rauli Nagla and Bera and the last son Sayyid Salar Auliya who obtained Kaithora in a similar manner to his grandfather. He had two sons, Sayyid Haider Khan whose descendant Sayyid Shahamat Khan settled in Miranpur and founded the Haider Khan Family and Sayyid Muhammad Khan whose descendants remained in Kaithora and formed the Muhammad Khani family.

Of the Muhammad Khan family, Nusrat Yar Khan and Rukhan ad Daula gained prominence during the reign of Muhammad Shah. Gaining the governance of Agra, Gujarat and Patna. They additionally held a Jagir of twenty eight villages in Ahmedabad which they gained in return for their service in annihilating their Tihanpuri brethren and which they retained until 1850. The Chatrauris of Morna review land grants to the west of Kali near Charthawal. There is a still Mosque in Morna built in the name of the wife of Nawab Hassan Khan, bakshi of Muhammad Shah. Constructed in 1725 at the cost of 1900 rupees.

Jagneri branch 
They are descendants of Sayyid Najmudin Hussain, who first settled at Bidauli, and some generations later his descendant Sayyid Fakhrudin moved to Palri in the Jauli pargana. Where he purchased propriety rights in Palri, Chanduri, Chandura, Tulsipur and Khera. Members of this branch reached high positions during the reign of Akbar and subsequent Emperors, but none gained the prominence which characterised other branches of the dynasty. The Jagneri Branch were heavily affected by drought, resulting in less prosperous conditions. However the head of Bidauli family still served as Nazim to the Nawabs of Oudh while his nephew was a Chakladar.

Kudliwal branch 
Members of this branch settled in Mujhera. Ain-i-Akbari makes mention of Sayyid Mahmud as being the first member of the Barha dynasty to enter into timurid service. Having formerly gained employment under the Sur Empire, he defected to the Mughals during the siege of Mankot during which he was with Sikander Sur but later sided with the emperor Akbar. In the first year of Akbar's reign he fought in a campaign against Muhammad Shah whose forced were led by Raja Hemu. In 1557 he took part in the Ajmer campaign and in the year after he took part in the capture of the fort of Jitasaran, along with an expedition against the Bhaduriyas of Hatkanth in Agra. in 1561 he was granted a Jagir near Delhi and later took part in a campaign with the Amorha Sayyids against the Raja Madhukar of Orcha. He died in 1574 and was buried in Majhera where his fort still remains.

In a famous incident, Sayyid mahmud was once asked how many generations back the Barha dynasty traced its sacred descent. Incidentally a fire was burning at a spot nearby and offended by the question, Sayyid Mahmud jumped into the fire exclaiming "If I am a Sayyid the fire will hurt me; if I am no Sayyid I shall get burnt". He stood for an hour in the fire and only left after the earnest request of a bystanders. His velvet slippers showed that indeed he had no sign of being burnt by the fire.

Gallery

References 

Arab dynasties